Tomb KV35 is the tomb of Pharaoh Amenhotep II located in the Valley of the Kings in Luxor, Egypt. Later, it was used as a cache for other royal mummies. It was discovered by Victor Loret in March 1898.

Layout and history
It has a dog's leg shape, typical of the layout of early Eighteenth Dynasty tombs, but several features make this tomb unusual. The burial chamber is rectangular and divided into upper and lower pillared sections, with the lower part holding the sarcophagus of the king. This style of burial chamber became standard for royal burials in the later New Kingdom.

Later the tomb was used as a mummy cache. Mummies belonging to the following individuals were relocated here during the Third Intermediate Period and were identified by inscriptions on their burial wrappings:

 Amenhotep II (the original tomb owner found in his original sarcophagus)

Side Chamber:

 Thutmose IV
 Amenhotep III
 Merneptah
 Seti II
 Siptah
 Ramesses IV
 Ramesses V
 Ramesses VI
 Queen Tiye, who was identified as the so-called Elder Lady in February 2010 via DNA testing.
 A prince, identified by some as Webensenu, son of Amenhotep II, whose canopic jars were found in the tomb, or Thutmose, the elder son of Amenhotep III and Tiye
 The Younger Lady who, in June 2003, was controversially claimed to be Nefertiti by British Egyptologist Joann Fletcher, whereas Egyptologist Zahi Hawass believed it to be Kiya, another wife of Akhenaten who is thought by some to be the birth mother of Tutankhamun. Some believed this mummy to be a male. However, with DNA testing, this mummy was shown in February 2010 to be a woman, the mother of Tutankhamun, and the daughter of Amenhotep III and Tiye (making her both the sister and wife of Akhenaten). Her name, however, remains unknown, leaving open the possibility that she is likely either Nebetiah or Beketaten.
 An "unknown woman D" in an upturned lid of a coffin inscribed for Setnakhte (may be queen Tawosret).
 Two skulls were found in the well and an anonymous arm was found with the above "Younger Lady". A body on a boat was stolen or destroyed at the start of the twentieth century.

References

External links

 William Max Miller's Theban Royal Mummy Project

1898 archaeological discoveries
Buildings and structures completed in the 14th century BC
Valley of the Kings
Amenhotep II